This is a list of publishing companies in Ukraine.

List

Ukraine
Lists of companies of Ukraine